George Washington Stephens (3 August 1866 – 6 February 1942) was a Canadian politician.

Born in Montreal, the son of George Washington Stephens and Elizabeth McIntosh, Stephens was educated at Montreal High School, McGill University, the University of Geneva, University of Marburg, and the Leibniz University Hannover. He worked with the firm of Steidtman & Company; J. and H. Taylor; and Thomas Robertson & Company, Limited. He was an administrator of his father's estate starting in 1902. He was president of the Canadian Rubber Company of Montreal and vice-president of the Canadian Consolidated Rubber Company Limited.

He was elected as the Liberal candidate by acclamation to the Legislative Assembly of Quebec for the electoral district of Montréal division no. 4 in a 1905 by-election. He did not run in the 1908 election. From 1907 to 1912, he was president of the Montreal Harbor Commission.

In 1898, he joined the Montreal Third Field Battery. He was promoted to major in 1902 and retired with the rank of Lieutenant-Colonel.

In 1923, he was appointed to the League of Nations. He was appointed a member of the Governing Commission of the Saar in 1923 and was its president from 1924 to 1926.

He died in Los Angeles, California in 1942 and was buried in Montreal.

References
 

1866 births
1942 deaths
High School of Montreal alumni
Politicians from Montreal
Quebec Liberal Party MNAs
Anglophone Quebec people
McGill University alumni
High Commissioners of the League of Nations at Saar